Delpinophytum is a monotypic genus of flowering plants belonging to the family Brassicaceae, with one species, Delpinophytum patagonicum (Speg.) Speg. 

Its native range is Southern Argentina.

The genus was named after Italian botanist Federico Delpino (1833–1905), then published and described in Anales Mus. Nac. Buenos Aires Vol.9 on page 9 in 1903.

References

Brassicaceae
Brassicaceae genera
Plants described in 1903